Azocane is a heterocyclic organic compound with the molecular formula C7H15N.  It consists of a saturated eight-membered ring having seven carbon atoms and one nitrogen atom attached to a single hydrogen atom.  The fully unsaturated analog of azocane is azocine.

Although azocane has limited uses, it is used in the preparation of  guanethidine and trocimine.

References

Azocanes